Pressure Cooker is a 2020 Indian Telugu-language comedy drama film directed by Sujoi Karampuri and Sushil Karampuri. The film features Sai Ronak and Preethi Asrani in the lead roles. The film was released on 21 February 2020.

Cast

 Sai Ronak as Kishore
 Preethi Asrani as Anitha
 Rahul Ramakrishna as Chandrasekhar, Kishore's friend
 Rajai Rowan as Pawan, Kishore's friend
 Tanikella Bharani as Anand Rao
 C. V. L. Narasimha Rao as Narayana, a farmer and Kishore's father
 Jhansi as Anitha's mother
 Raj Madiraju as Anitha's father
 Sangeetha as Sunanda Rao
 Ravi Varma as Harish "Harry" Rao, Anand Rao and Sunanda's son 
 Kireeti Damaraju as Manohar Rao, Anand Rao and Sunanda's son 
 Uttej as Shiva Reddy, the head of EZ Visa Consultants
 Keshav Deepak as the owner of Microinfo company

Soundtrack  

The music is composed by Sunil Kashyap, Rahul Sipligunj, Smaran and Harshavardhan Rameshwar, and released on Aditya Music label.

Home media 
The digital rights of the film was sold to AHA. The film is now available on AHA. Also streaming in Amazon Prime Video

Reception  
A critic from The Hindu noted that "This one [film] is more like television serial but even serials are high on drama and emotions". A critic from The Times of India gave the film a rating of two-and-a-half out of five stars and stated that "Pressure Cooker pretends to be fresh, but is a regular and cliché fare that manages to work".  A critic from Telangana Today wrote that "The theme of Sujoi and Sushil evokes interest among audiences but screenplay is a bit disappointing."

References

External links 
 

2020s Telugu-language films
2020 films
Indian comedy-drama films